Mike Faiola is an American actor. He is best known for playing the role of Eric in Quarterlife and Kevin Hamilton in Awkward.

Filmography

Film

Television

References

External links

Living people
American male film actors
American male television actors
1978 births